Khachatur ( from խաչ (xačʿ, "cross") + տուր (tur, "something given" = "given by cross". It may refer to:

Khachatur Abovian (1809–1848), Armenian writer and national public figure who mysteriously vanished in 1848 and was presumed dead
Khachatur Avetisyan (1926–1996), influential Armenian-Soviet composer
Khachatur Kesaratsi (1590–1646), archbishop, credited with the founding of the first printing press in Iran
Khachatur Maloumian (1865), Dashnak; editor of Mushak and Droshak
Khachatur Malumian, a.k.a. Aknuni (1863–1915), Armenian journalist and political activist
Khachatur of Taron, Armenian poet and musician who occupies a special place among the writers of Sharakans
Khachatur-Bek of Mush, Armenian Bek in the first half of the 19th century

Armenian given names